In the Tradition is an album by American saxophonist and composer Anthony Braxton recorded in 1974 and released on the Danish SteepleChase label. The album features Braxton's interpretations of jazz standards and was followed by a second volume recorded at the same sessions which was released in 1976. It was originally going to be a Dexter Gordon album, but due to Dexter being ill, Braxton filled in for him.

Reception
The AllMusic review by Scott Yanow stated: "The great avant-gardist Anthony Braxton threw the jazz world a curve with this album. ...A historical curiosity, this set is not as essential as Braxton's explorations of his own music."

Track listing
 "Marshmallow" (Warne Marsh) - 7:51
 "Goodbye Pork Pie Hat" (Charles Mingus) - 4:56
 "Just Friends" (John Klenner, Sam M. Lewis) - 9:50
 "Ornithology" (Benny Harris, Charlie Parker) - 7:24
 "Lush Life" (Billy Strayhorn) - 12:02
 "Trane's Blues" (John Coltrane) - 5:34 Bonus track on CD reissue

Personnel
Anthony Braxton – alto saxophone, contrabass clarinet
Tete Montoliu - piano
Niels-Henning Ørsted Pedersen - bass
Albert Heath - drums

References

SteepleChase Records albums
Anthony Braxton albums
1974 albums